The California state special elections, 2009 were held on May 19, 2009 throughout the state of California. The elections were authorized by the State Legislature and Governor Arnold Schwarzenegger as a part of a budget signed into law on February 19, 2009. Voters voted on six ballot propositions, 1A through 1F, for the open 26th State Senate district seat, and in a primary for the open 32nd congressional district seat. All of the propositions except 1F were defeated.

Background 

In February 2009 the State Legislature narrowly passed the 2008–2009 state budget during a special session, months after it was due. As part of the plan to lower the state's annual deficits, the State Legislature ordered a special election with various budget reform ballot propositions.

Propositions

Proposition 1A 

Proposition 1A was a constitutional amendment that would have increased the annual contributions to the state's rainy day fund.

Proposition 1B 

Proposition 1B would have secured additional funding for primary education, but only if Proposition 1A passed as well.

Proposition 1C 

Proposition 1C was a constitutional amendment that would have made significant changes to the operation of the State Lottery.

Proposition 1D 

Proposition 1D would have authorized a one-time reallocation of tobacco tax revenue to help balance the state budget.

Proposition 1E 

Proposition 1E would have authorized a one-time reallocation of income tax revenue to help balance the state budget.

Proposition 1F 

Proposition 1F prohibited pay raises for members of the State Legislature, the Governor, and other state officials during deficit years.

Opinion polling 
Field Poll: March 3, 2009

SurveyUSA Poll: March 11–12, 2009 (commissioned by KABC-TV, KFSN-TV, KGTV-TV, and KPIX-TV)

PPIC Poll: March 25, 2009

SurveyUSA Poll: April 20–21, 2009 (commissioned by KABC-TV, KFSN-TV, KGTV-TV, and KPIX-TV)

Field Poll: April 29, 2009

26th State Senate district special election 
A special election to fill the 26th district of the State Senate was called by Governor Schwarzenegger on December 10, 2008 as a consequence of the resignation of former State Senator Mark Ridley-Thomas following his election to the Los Angeles County Board of Supervisors. A special primary election was held on March 24, 2009, and the special election was held on May 19, 2009.

Candidates 
A total of eight candidates registered for the special election, but only three qualified for the special election:

Democratic 
 Robert Cole, a member of the Los Angeles County Citizens' Economy and Efficiency Committee
 Mike Davis, the State Assemblymember from the 48th district
 Saundra Davis, a board member of the Culver City Unified School District and a businesswoman
 Mervin Leon Evans, an author and management consultant
 Jonathan Friedman, a financial analyst
 Curren D. Price, Jr., the State Assemblymember from the 51st district

Peace and Freedom 
 Cindy Variela Henderson, a communications technician

Republican 
 Nachum Shifren, an educator

Primary election 
An open primary election for the special election was held on March 24, 2009. Since no candidate won a majority, the candidates with the top votes for each party advanced to the special general election. Price won more votes than any other Democrat while Shifren and Henderson were the only candidates of their parties.

Special election 
In the special runoff election, Democratic Curren Price won by a large margin, beating Republican Nachum Schifren and Peace and Freedom Party candidate Cindy Henderson.

32nd congressional district special primary election 

A special election to fill the 32nd congressional district was called by Governor Schwarzenegger on March 10, 2009 as a consequence of the resignation of former Congresswoman Hilda Solis following her appointment as United States Secretary of Labor. The special primary election was May 19, 2009 while the special election was held on July 14, 2009. The election was won by Democrat Judy Chu, who became the first Chinese American woman elected to serve in Congress.

Primary election 
In the May 19 primary, Democrat Judy Chu led all candidates, but failed to gain enough to prevent a runoff general election. Betty Chu qualified as the Republican candidate for the runoff and Christopher Agrella qualified as the Libertarian.

Special election 
In the special runoff election, Democratic Judy Chu won by a significant margin, beating Republican Betty Chu and Libertarian candidate Christopher Agrella.

References 

 
California